Olivella minuta, common name the minute dwarf olive, is a species of small sea snail, marine gastropod mollusk in the subfamily Olivellinae, in the family Olividae, the olives.  Species in the genus Olivella are commonly called dwarf olives.

Description
The size of the shell varies between 6 mm and 15 mm.

This species has a small, oblong shell which comes to a conical point on the front end, this is similar to other marine snail shells. They have brown patterning on the middle section of their shells that can range from a chevron patterning to a random dispersement of lines and blotches to many more varieties. Their common size is 13mm, though they can naturally grow larger than these.

Distribution
This marine species is widely distributed, over the seas of the Western Hemisphere. They live in the tropical waters of the Caribbean Sea, the Gulf of Mexico and off the Lesser Antilles. They can be found off the coasts of Colombia, San Andres, Jamaica, Mexico, Panama, and Puerto Rico, but these shells have been found as far south as Argentina, so it is likely that they live wherever the waters are warm enough.

References

 Duclos P.L. (1844-1848). Oliva. In J.C. Chenu, Illustrations conchyliologiques ou description et figures de toutes les coquilles connues vivantes et fossiles, classées suivant le système de Lamarck modifié d'après les progrès de la science et comprenant les genres nouveaux et les espèces récemment découvertes: 5-28
 Rosenberg, G.; Moretzsohn, F.; García, E. F. (2009). Gastropoda (Mollusca) of the Gulf of Mexico, Pp. 579–699 in: Felder, D.L. and D.K. Camp (eds.), Gulf of Mexico–Origins, Waters, and Biota. Texas A&M Press, College Station, Texas.
 Paulmier G. (2015). Les Olivellidae (Neogastropoda) des Antilles françaises. Description de quatre nouvelles espèces. Xenophora Taxonomy. 8: 3-23.

External links
 Link, D. H. F. (1807–1808). Beschreibung der Naturalien-Sammlung der Universität zu Rostock. Rostock, Adlers Erben. 1 Abt. [Part 1], pp. 1–50; 2 Abt. [Part 2], pp. 51–100; 3 Abt. [Part 3], pp. 101–165; Abt. 4 [Part 4],pp. 1–30; Abt. 5 [Part 5], pp. 1–38 [1808]; Abt. 6 [Part 6], pp. 1–38
 Duclos, P. L. (1835-1840). Histoire naturelle générale et particulière de tous les genres de coquilles univalves marines a l'état vivant et fossile publiée par monographie. Genre Olive. Paris: Institut de France. 33 plates: pls 1-12
 Reeve, L. A. (1850). Monograph of the genus Oliva. In: Conchologia Iconica, or, illustrations of the shells of molluscous animals, vol. 6, pl. 1-30 and unpaginated text. L. Reeve & Co., London
 Ducros de Saint Germain A. M. P. (1857). Revue critique du genre Oliva de Bruguières. 120 pp
  Castro Oliveira, C.D. de. (2011). Systematics of the cryptic species complex Olivella minuta (Gastropoda, Olividae). The Malacologists. 57: 10-11
 
 MNHN, Paris: syntype

minuta
Gastropods described in 1807